was a Japanese pop rock band formed in Osaka in 2002. The band consists of lead vocalist U-ka Saegusa, lead guitarist Yūichirō Iwai, lead bassist Taku Ōyabu, and drummer Keisuke Kurumatani. Signed to Giza Studio, the band released four studio albums before disbanding in 2010. They're known for performing the several theme songs for the Japanese anime series, Case Closed. One of the songs, "Kimi to Yakusoku Shita Yasashii Ano Basho made", became the band's best-selling single, selling approximately 34,000 copies nationwide.

Band members

 Final line-up 
  – lead vocals (2002-2010)
  – lead guitar, backing vocals (2003-2010)
  – lead bass (2003-2010)
  – drums, percussion (2003-2010)

Former members
  (2002)

History
The band formed in 2002 around lead vocalist Yūka "U-ka" Saegusa, the band's first three singles were all featured in the anime Cheeky Angel. Its first hit single was "Kimi to Yakusoku Shita Yasashii Ano Basho Made", a theme song of the popular anime Detective Conan, which reached #8 in the Oricon charts. On October 21, 2009, Saegusa stated that the band would disband in January 2010.

Discography

Albums

Studio albums

Compilation albums

Extended plays

Singles

As a lead artist

Video albums

Collaborations
 "The Hit Parade" (with Tak Matsumoto, November 26, 2003)
 "100 Mono Tobira" (100もの扉, with Rina Aiuchi and Sparkling Point, June 14, 2006)
 "Nanatsu no Umi wo Wataru Kaze no You Ni" (七つの海を渡る風のように, (with Aiuchi Rina, April 11, 2007)

References

Japanese pop music groups
Musical groups established in 2002
Musical groups disestablished in 2010
Being Inc. artists
2002 establishments in Japan